Hanskurt Höcker (1 August 1894 – 10 August 1961) was a German general during World War II who commanded several divisions. He was a recipient of the Knight's Cross of the Iron Cross of Nazi Germany.

Awards

 Knight's Cross of the Iron Cross on 14 April 1943 as Generalmajor and commander of 258. Infanterie-Division

References

Citations

Bibliography

1894 births
1961 deaths
German Army personnel of World War I
German prisoners of war in World War II
Lieutenant generals of the German Army (Wehrmacht)
People from Hagen
People from the Province of Westphalia
Recipients of the clasp to the Iron Cross, 1st class
Recipients of the Gold German Cross
Recipients of the Knight's Cross of the Iron Cross
Military personnel from North Rhine-Westphalia